Mass media in Uzbekistan is concerned with the situation of Uzbek media. Although a government decree officially eliminated state censorship in 2002, it has continued to severely restrict independent journalism, particularly following the Andijon uprising of 2005. Licensing and regulation are the purview of the State Press Committee and the Inter-Agency Coordination Committee, which use their authority to harass and delay the activities of independent media outlets. In late 2006, authorities further tightened state control by requiring re-registration by all media outlets not passing a summary review of qualifications. In 2005 some 30 to 40 independent television stations and seven independent radio stations were in operation, but four state-owned television stations, run by the Television and Radio Company of Uzbekistan, dominated the market. No live programming is allowed.

Total newspaper readership is estimated at only 50,000; the newspaper market is dominated by the state-owned papers Pravda Vostoka, Halq Sozi, and Narodnoye Slovo. The largest privately owned papers are Novosti Uzbekistana, Noviy Vek, Noviy Den, and Mohiyat. The state controls newspaper distribution and materials supply. In the early 2000s, newspaper articles occasionally have criticized government policy and social conditions, but bribery of journalists is common.

The only national news agency, the Uzbekistan National News Agency, is state-controlled. Agence France-Presse, Anadolu Ajansı (of Turkey), the Associated Press, Interfax (of Russia), and Reuters are foreign agencies with offices in Uzbekistan. The government forced Radio Free Europe–Radio Liberty to close its Tashkent office in late 2005. In early 2006, a new media law placed further restrictions on the activities of foreign news organizations in Uzbekistan.

In 2011, the flow of information coming out of the country remains tightly controlled by the authorities but a few independent voices are still reporting from inside Uzbekistan. The Uznews.net news website has been operational since 2006 and is one of the few sources that still has a network of journalists on the ground reporting on day-to-day events in Uzbekistan.

Journalism in Uzbekistan is a dangerous profession with a number of reporters imprisoned for simply doing their jobs. Uzbekistan is the leading jailer of journalists in the region. As of 2011 there were eleven journalists behind bars in Uzbekistan.

Television

Television in Uzbekistan was first introduced in 1956 when Uzbek SSR was part of the Soviet Union. The first national television channel was Oʻzbekiston, which was introduced during beginning transmission of Uzbekistan. Colour television was also introduced in the 1970s. Back then, Oʻzbekiston was the only TV channel, and it broadcast several times a day. Uzbekistan's first private television channel STV, started broadcasting on 15 May 1991.

In 2005 some 30 to 40 independent television stations were in operation, but four state-owned television stations, run by the Television and Radio Company of Uzbekistan, dominated the market. No live programming is allowed.

Digital

Uzdigital
Uzbekistan's first and leading digital platform Uzdigital, launched in 2009. In 2013, high definition television in HD has been launched on a commercial basis. Uzdigital recently launched its own HD channels such as Zoʻr TV HD, MY5 HD, Sevimli HD, Kinoteatr HD, Milliy HD, and UzHD.

In September 2012 audiences had reached 1 million.

See also
Communications in Uzbekistan

References

 
Uzbekistan
Uzbekistan